The Romanian language is widely spoken in Serbia. This country hosts large native Romanian-speaking populations, which can be divided into the ethnic Romanians in the autonomous region of Vojvodina and the Vlachs of the Timok Valley, a geographical region in Central Serbia. The former speak the Banat Romanian dialect, identify as Romanians and have full rights within the autonomous region. Romanian is one of the six officially recognized languages of Vojvodina. Vlachs speak archaic varieties of the Banat and Oltenian dialects, but they do not identify as Romanians and their language is not recognized as Romanian within Serbia. A "Vlach language" has gone under attempted standardization in the country, using a Cyrillic alphabet. This has been criticized in Romania, and attempts to bring Romanian-language resources and education to the Timok Vlachs have been blocked by the Serbian authorities.

Vojvodina

Legal status
Article 10 of the Constitution of the Republic of Serbia (2006) stipulates that in the Republic of Serbia the Serbian language and the Cyrillic script shall be officially used. In addition it notes that in the regions inhabited by national minorities, their own languages and scripts shall be officially used, as established by law.

Article 6 of the Statute of the Autonomous Province of Vojvodina (published in the Official Gazette of APV) determines that, together with the Serbo-Croat language and Cyrillic script, and the Latin script as stipulated by the law, the Hungarian, Slovak, Romanian and Rusyn languages and their scripts, as well as languages and scripts of other nationalities, shall simultaneously be officially used in the work of the bodies of the Autonomous Province of Vojvodina, as established by the law. The bodies of the Autonomous Province of Vojvodina are: the Assembly, the Executive Council and the Provincial administrative bodies.

The National Council of the Romanian National Minority has a department that attends to the analysis and promotion of the official use of the Romanian language.

Among others, decisions and laws established by the Assembly of the Autonomous Province of Vojvodina, bulletins and publications of the Assembly and the Executive Council, as well as other acts of provincial interest issued by the authorities of the Republic of Serbia must all be translated into Romanian. Assembly sessions are simultaneously interpreted in Romanian. The Provincial Secretariat for Regulations, Administration and National Minorities, through its sections and departments, collects and analyses data regarding the exercise of the rights of the national minorities in the domains of culture, education, information, the official use of the languages and the alphabets.It also watches the orderliness of the laws that stipulate this. The Secretariat prepares materials that are published in the "Official Gazette of the Autonomous Province of Vojvodina", in the Serbian language and in the languages of national minorities that are in official use in the Autonomous Province of Vojvodina. The Provincial Secretariat for Regulations, Administration and National Minorities also sends Romanian judicial interprets to the district courts in Novi Sad and Pančevo.

At the local level, the Romanian language and script are officially used in Alibunar, Bela Crkva, Žitište, Zrenjanin, Kovačica, Kovin, Plandište and Sečanj. In Vršac, Romanian is official in the villages with ethnic Romanian majority: Vojvodinci (Romanian: Voivodiț), Markovac (Romanian: Marcovăț), Straža (Romanian: Straja), Mali Žam (Romanian: Jamu Mic), Malo Središte (Romanian: Srediștea Mică), Mesić (Romanian: Mesici), Jablanka (Romanian: Jablanka), Sočica (Romanian: Sălcița), Ritiševo (Romanian: Râtișor), Orešac (Romanian: Oreșaț) and Kuštilj (Romanian: Coștei).

The non-governmental organisation "Municipal parliament the "free" city of Vršac" (Romanian: Parlamentul orășenesc orașul "liber" Vârșeț) started a project to encourage the public use of Romanian as an official language. The campaign is included in the program "Minority Rights in Practice in South Eastern Europe", initiated together by the King Baudouin Foundation, Open Society Found Belgrade, Charles Stewart Mott Foundation and the Citizen's Initiatives.

In the 2002 census, Serbia's most recent, 1.45% citizens of Vojvodina declared Romanian as their mother tongue (0.1% of the world's Romanophones).

Religious education and service

Vojvodina hosts 40 Romanian historical parishes, with 42 priests. It is under the jurisdiction of the Romanian Orthodox Eparchy "Dacia Felix" based in Vršac and headed by Daniil Partoşanul, vicar bishop of the Archdiocese of Timişoara.

Starting in 2006, religion in the Romanian language is taught in state schools. Textbooks for the first and the second grade were published after they were approved by the Commission of the Government of the Republic of Serbia for Religious Education in Elementary and Middle Schools.

Arts
On 15 November 2003, the professional Romanian theatre was refounded, after almost 50 years, to perform in Romanian. The theatre is based in Vršac, on the scene of the "Sterija" National Theatre.

Romanian literature is represented in Banat starting with Victor Vlad Delamarina and including more recent writers. The contribution of Vojvodina-based writers is significant within the works published in the entire Banat, through authors such as Vasile Barbu, president of the "Tibiscus" Literary-Artistic Society in Uzdin, Pavel Gătăiantu, Ana Niculina Ursulescu, Virginia Popovici, Slavco Almăjan and Marina Puia Bădescu. The state finances a publishing house, Libertatea. Casa de Presă şi Editură Libertatea publishes 20 titles each year. For the 45th edition of the Belgrade Book Fair, the house prepared a CD with the nine most successful titles, under the slogan "3,000 pages for the third millennium". Other publishers are based in Vojvodina, including Editura Fundaţiei.

Education
Vojvodina hosts 37 education facilities that use Romanian as their teaching language, including two high schools. 145 Romanian students from Vojvodina and the Timok Valley took part in scholarship interviews in Romanian high schools and universities for school year 2005–2006. An education school operates in Vršac as well as a Romanian language departament at the University of Novi Sad. School curricula are offered in the Romanian language from kindergarten to high school; an Institute prepares Romanian language textbooks. Four schools teach exclusively in Romanian, in places with ethnic Romanian majority: Grebenac (Romanian: Grebenaţ), Nikolinci (Romanian: Nicolinţ), Kuštilj (Romanian: Coştei) and Lokve (Romanian: Sân-Mihai).

Media

Vojvodina provides public information in the Romanian language, as per the Statute of the APV, article 15. The government partially finances daily and weekly newspapers in the languages of the national minorities, among them the Romanian weekly Libertatea (Pančevo). Other Romanian publications include Tinereţea (issued by the Libertatea group) and Cuvântul Românesc (Vršac). Radio Novi Sad and TV Novi Sad each have Romanian language sections, broadcasting Romanian-aimed schedule 6 hours a day on the radio and one to one and a half-hour on TV daily. BBC Romanian is retransmitted by Radio FAR in Alibunar on FM. Vojvodina receives channel 1 (În direct, România) of Radio România Internaţional (24/24), and the Romanian national TV station TVR1. Other Romanian-language channels can be received through the DTH service offered by the Serbian subsidiary of the Romanian telecommunications company RCS & RDS (Digi TV), as follows: Antena 1, Minimax Romania, Jetix, UTV, DDTV, OTV, Discovery Civilisation, Discovery Science, Discovery Travel & Living, Animal Planet, Animax, Zone Reality, National Geographic Channel, Eurosport, Viasat History and Viasat Explorer in the basis package, as well as Pro TV Internaţional, Antena 3, Realitatea TV, TVS Oradea, TVS Craiova, Etno TV, Favorit TV, Taraf TV in a special Romanian package.

Victoria, a 24-hour Romanian-language radio station, was launched in 2006. It broadcasts on 96.1 FM informative, musical and cultural formats. The radio station can also be streamed.

Timok Valley

Status
The Romanian language has far less support in the Timok Valley. Although whether the speech of the Vlachs is really Romanian and the endonym  ("Vlach language") exists, all linguists consider them to speak Romanian.

Serbian statistics list Vlach and Romanian languages separately depending on what people declared in the census. This does not mean that the Serbian government has an official position on the matter. ISO has not assigned it a separate language code following the ISO 639 standard. In the 2002 census, 40,054 people in Serbia declared themselves ethnic Vlachs and 54,818 people declared themselves native speakers of the Vlach language.

The Romanian language of Timok does not have official status and it is not standardized. Thus, some members of the Timok Vlach community ask for standard Romanian to be made official in the areas inhabited by Vlachs until the standardization of a proposed"Vlach language".

According to some media sources, Serbia recognized "Romanian" as the native language of the Vlach community, through the act of confirmation of the National Council of the Vlach (Roumanian) National Minority in August 2007; the organization had listed Romanian as the native language of the community in their statute.

Characteristics
Its two main variants, "Ungurean" and "Țăran", are subordinated forms of the Romanian varieties spoken in Banat and Oltenia, respectively.

The speakers have been isolated from Romania and their speech did not include the neologisms (for some abstract notions, as well as technological, political and scientific concepts) borrowed by Romanian speakers across the Danube from French and Italian and as such, they use Serbian counterparts, as Serbian has been the language of education for nearly two centuries.

Media
Radio Zaječar and Radio Pomoravlje broadcast programmes in the Romanian variant of the Timok Vlachs.

See also
 Romania–Serbia relations
 Romanians of Serbia
 Romanian language in Ukraine

References

Languages of Serbia
Languages of Vojvodina
Timok Valley
Romanians in Serbia
Vlachs of Serbia
Geographical distribution of the Romanian language
Romania–Serbia relations